The Redwalls were an American rock band from Deerfield, Illinois, in suburban Chicago.

The band was composed of singer/guitarist Logan Baren, bassist Justin Baren, lead guitarist Andrew Langer and a revolving cast of drummers (founding member Jordan Kozer played on debut album Universal Blues, then Ben Greeno who played on De Nova and Rob Jensen who played on the self titled third album The Redwalls).

History
Formed in 2001 whilst still in high school, the Redwalls were originally a British Invasion-inspired cover band named The Pages. They played their first show at the local jazz club Pops for Champagne. Soon after, they began writing original material and earned a regular booking at the local Evanston club Nevin's Live, with the venue's booking manager Mitchell Marlow, who eventually quit his post to manage the band full-time. With the help of Marlow's longtime friend and former Wilco drummer Ken Coomer, the band's demo recording made its way to Capitol Records' A&R Julian Raymond, and while in the midst of working on their debut LP for the Chicago-based indie label Undertow, the band signed to Capitol in mid-2003. The band changed their name to The Redwalls at the label's request due to a conflict regarding an earlier Capitol signing known as Pages, who were better known as Mr. Mister. The band finished recording in 2003, however after completing sessions for the album, Kozer quit the group to attend college and was replaced by Ben Greeno. The Redwalls' debut album Universal Blues was later released on November 18, 2003.

Nearly two years after Universal Blues the band released their second studio album (first under Capitol Records), titled De Nova on June 21, 2005. Shortly after, The Redwalls were invited to join Oasis on their Summer 2005 UK tour and were also featured at Lollapalooza in 2005 and 2006. In 2007, The Redwalls finished recording material for their third studio album, however before its release, the band was dropped from Capitol Records. They quickly signed with indie label MAD Dragon Records and their album The Redwalls was later released on October 23, 2007. In addition, their song "Build a Bridge" was featured on an AT&T commercial. By 2008, the band had achieved moderate success and began their highly successful US tour, which culminated with performances on the Late Show with David Letterman and The Tonight Show with Jay Leno on April 10, 2008. In the latter part of 2008, Ben Greeno left the group and was replaced by Rob Jensen. The Redwalls once again began touring in the UK, this time supporting The Zutons. However, lead guitarist Andrew Langer left the group to focus on other musical projects. Commenting on his decision to leave the band, he stated that "The Redwalls was our childhood dream. It was a fun and exciting experience for a while, but as my musical taste grew outside of that bubble, it became apparent that I wanted to move in a different direction". Session musician Duane Leinan joined the band in 2010 playing bass guitar supporting the tour and in the studio.

The Redwalls released their debut UK single "Memories" on January 5, 2009. Shortly after, drummer Rob Jensen announced his departure from the group to focus on other musical projects. In regards to Jensen's departure, Justin stated through the band's MySpace:

Post-split

Following his departure from the band, guitarist Andrew Langer joined Ezra Furman and the Harpoons as guitarist in 2008 and also formed The Sleeptalkers with original Redwalls drummer Jordan Kozer. They self-released their debut album Back To Earth in 2009.

Discography
 Universal Blues (2003)
 De Nova (2005)
 The Redwalls (2007)

EPs
The Wall to Wall Sessions (2007)

References

External links
NPR Interview with the Baren brothers

Alternative rock groups from Illinois
MAD Dragon Records artists
Musical groups from Chicago
Musical groups established in 2001
People from Deerfield, Illinois
Independent Music Awards winners